Sally Haley (June 29, 1908 – September 1, 2007) was an American painter.  Her career spanned much of the 20th century and she is credited for helping to expand the emerging art scene in Portland, Oregon during the middle of the century. Much of her work was an application of egg tempera, a technique which leaves a flat, brushless surface. She preferred domestic subjects and interior spaces with hints of the indoor or outdoor space that lay beyond.

Sally Haley was a native in Bridgeport, Connecticut.  She attended Yale University.  She moved across the country to Portland in 1947 with her husband, the late Michele Russo, who was also an artist. A native of Bridgeport, Conn., Haley attended Yale University and moved to Portland in 1947 with her husband. Haley and Russo were a fiery, passionate couple, within a dedicated subculture of artists during Portland's mid-20th century. That group helped create a small but dynamic art scene. Like Haley and Russo, those artists, including Carl and Hilda Morris, Louis Bunce and William Givler, came from or often traveled to the East Coast, putting a vivid stamp on the intellectual climate of a seemingly provincial art scene geographically cut off from the art world's major centers. Russo died in 2004.

Haley and her husband were part of a group of artists who helped to create a small art scene in Portland, which are now a part of the city's landscape.  Haley herself was widely known and praised by art critics for her portraits and still life paintings. She held many solo and group exhibitions throughout her long career. She has been honored twice with retrospectives, one at the Portland Art Museum in 1975, which holds her work in their collection, and another at Marylhurst College in 1993. Haley received the prestigious Oregon Governor's Award for the Arts, in 1989. Her work is also part of many public and private collections, including the Tacoma Art Museum, Washington; The Hallie Ford Museum of Art at Willamette University, Salem, Oregon; the American Telephone and Telegraph Company of New York, the Federal Reserve Bank of San Francisco, California; and Kaiser Foundation and Portland Civic Auditorium in Oregon.

Haley was one of the muralists involved in painting post office murals as part of the Federal Art Project.   She completed the twelve-foot-long mural, Mail-The Connecting Link,  in McConnelsville, Ohio in 1938.  While her largest work, depicting the outdoors was not her favored subject matter. She preferred domestic subjects and interior spaces with hints of the indoor or outdoor space that lay beyond.

Sally Haley died at an assisted living facility in  Portland, Oregon on September 1, 2007 at the age of 99. She was survived by two sons, Gian and Michael.

References

American women painters
Artists from Bridgeport, Connecticut
Artists from Portland, Oregon
Yale University alumni
1908 births
2007 deaths
Painters from Oregon
20th-century American painters
Painters from Connecticut
American muralists
People of the New Deal arts projects
20th-century American women artists
Women muralists
21st-century American women